Examination may refer to:
 Physical examination, a medical procedure
 Questioning and more specific forms thereof, for example in law:
 Cross-examination
 Direct examination
 Exam as assessment, also "test", "exams", "evaluation"
 Civil service entrance examination
 Imperial examination

See also
 Analysis
 Appraisal (disambiguation)
 Assessment (disambiguation)
 Evaluation
 Evaluation (disambiguation)
 Exam (disambiguation)
 Investigation (disambiguation)
 Study (disambiguation)